Castelnau-Montratier (Languedocien: Castèlnau de Montratièr) is a former commune in the Lot department in south-western France. On 1 January 2017, it was merged into the new commune Castelnau-Montratier-Sainte-Alauzie.

Geography
The Barguelonne flows southwestward through the northern part of the commune.

See also
Communes of the Lot department

References

Castelnaumontratier